Limnophyes is a genus of non-biting midges belonging to the family Chironomidae.

Species

Species include:

Holarctic species

L. asquamatus
L. brachytomus
L. eltoni
L. minimus - global distribution except Australasia
L. natalensis - global distribution except Australasia and South America
L. ninae
L. pentaplastus
L. pumilio

European species

L. aagaardi - Norway, Eastern Palaearctic
L. angelicae - British Isles, Germany, European Russia
L. bidumus - Scandinavia, Germany, Italy
L. cranstoni - France, Andorra
L. difficilis - Palaearctic
L. edwardsi - Palaearctic
L. er - Scandinavia, European Russia
L. gurgicola - Palaearctic, Indomalaya, Near East
L. habilis - Palaearctic
L. inanispatina - France
L. italicola - Italy
L. madeirae - Madeira
L. palmensis - Canary Islands
L. paludis - Britain, Northwest Europe
L. prolatus - Germany, Novaya Zemlya
L. punctipennis - Western Europe
L. roquehautensis - France
L. schnelli - far north of Palaearctic
L. spinigus - Scandinavia, Central Europe
L. torulus - Norway, Novaya Zemlya

Nearctic species

L. anderseni
L. atomarius
L. carolinensis
L. coloradensis
L. doughmani
L. fumosus
L. hastulatus
L. margaretae
L. pilicistulus
L. prolongatus
L. recisus

References
Fauna Europaea
Nomina Insecta Nearctica

Chironomidae
Culicomorpha genera